The Museum “Jews in Latvia” is located in Riga, Latvia. The main tasks of the museum are the research and popularisation of History of the Jews in Latvia, as well as the collection and preservation of evidence regarding the community of Latvian Jews from its beginning until the present time. The museum was founded in 1989. It is part of the Latvian Jewish community and one of the few private museums in Latvia accredited by the state.

The current director since 2008 is Latvian historian Iļja Ļenskis.

History
The museum was founded by a group of Holocaust survivors, under the leadership of the historian Marģers Vestermanis in 1989. In the beginning, the museum acted as a centre of documentation, but in 1996 the first small, permanent exhibition was organised. Currently, the museum is located in three halls, showcasing the history of Latvian Jews from the 16th century until 1945. Lectures, educational programmes and different cultural events are organised in the museum.

Exhibition

The museum's exhibition consists of three parts – Jews in Latvia until the year 1918, Jews in Latvia in the years 1918 – 1941 and Jews in Nazi-occupied Latvia. The exhibition opens with the early period of Latvian Jewish history – from the arrival of Jews on Latvian territory in the 16th century until the 19th century. The exhibition speaks about social, economic, political, intellectual and religious life, the legal status of Jews as well as their participation in various historical events in Latvia. The third hall is devoted to the tragic events of the Holocaust on Latvian territory. A special chapter is devoted to the honourable deeds of those Latvian citizens who rescued Jews from nearly complete extermination.

The French film maker Philippe Labrune saw a photograph in the Jewish Museum  of 4 women and a girl and began an investigation to out who the girl was. He discovered that she was Sorella Epstein and a French documentary was made on the investigation. It was broadcast in France in 2015.

Building
The museum is located in the building of the Riga Jewish community, a historical building which was once a Jewish club and theatre. It was built in the years 1913-1914 by the architects Edmund von Trompowsky and Paul Mandelstamm. Here in 1926 a Jewish theatre troupe started its performances, and thus the building was renovated. Various public organisations and a Jewish library were also located in this building. Jewish celebrations were often organised here– weddings, lectures, shows and meetings. During the German occupation of Latvia (1941-1944), a German officers' club was located here. During Soviet times the building served as a place of political education: various ideological events, as well as congresses of the Communist Party, were held there. The building was given back to the Jewish community in the early 1990s. Currently, the building is a state-protected architectural monument.

Collection of museum
The collection of the museum “Jews in Latvia” is the foundation on which the museum bases its organisation of exhibitions and research. Currently, the museum has around 14,000 items. Of these items, more than 5,000 make up the main stock, which is included in the Latvian National collection of museums. The collection consists of documents, photos, books and objects. A collection of memoirs from the 19th-20th century, a plentiful collection of family photos and materials of various Jewish organisations in the interwar period are to be noted separately.

See also
History of the Jews in Latvia

References

External links
Museum “Jews in Latvia”
Council of the Jewish Communities of Latvia

Museums in Riga
Museums established in 1989
Latvia
Jews and Judaism in Riga
1989 establishments in Latvia